Flexilinea is a bacteria genus from the family of Anaerolineaceae with one known species (Flexilinea flocculi). Flexilinea flocculi has been isolated from methanogenic granular sludge.

References

Chloroflexota
Bacteria genera
Monotypic bacteria genera